The boys' doubles of the tournament 2009 BWF World Junior Championships was held on 28 October–1 November 2009. The Malaysian pair of Chooi Kah Ming and Ow Yao Han took out the boys' doubles final defeating Indonesian pair, Berry Angriawan and Muhammad Ulinnuha in three sets.

Seeds

  Angga Pratama / Yohanes Rendy Sugiarto (semi-final)
  Liu Peixuan / Lu Kai (quarter-final)
  Chooi Kah Ming / Ow Yao Han (champion)
  Tin Caballes / Nipitphon Puangpuapech (semi-final)
  Emil Holst / Niclas Nohr (quarter-final)
  Berry Angriawan / Muhammad Ulinnuha (final)
  Sai Praneeth / Pranav Chopra (third round)
  Shohei Hoshino / Akira Kobayashi (quarter-final)

Draw

Finals

Top-half

Section 1

Section 2

Bottom half

Section 3

Section 4

References

2009 BWF World Junior Championships